Event One of the 2017 Monster Energy FIM Speedway World Cup was the opening race of the 2017 edition of the Speedway World Cup. It was staged on July 1 at the Adrian Flux Arena in King's Lynn, Great Britain and was won by Great Britain  from Australia, United States, and the Czech Republic. As a result, Great Britain progressed directly to the 2017 Speedway World Cup Final, while Australia and the United States progressed to the 2017 Speedway World Cup Race-off. The Czech Republic were eliminated.

Craig Cook led Great Britain to the final by scoring 14 points, while Steve Worrall, Chris Harris and Robert Lambert all scored 13 points each. Australia were hampered by the loss of Jason Doyle, who was injured and unable to compete, however Chris Holder was the star of the meeting scoring 19 points.

Results

Scores

References

See also 
 2017 Speedway Grand Prix

2017 Speedway World Cup